The athletics competition at the 1981 Summer Universiade was held at the National Stadium in Bucharest, Romania, in July 1981. The programme featured 23 events for men and 16 for women. A total of fourteen Universiade records were broken during the 1981 Games.

The Soviet Union was the most successful nation medals-wise as it topped the table with eleven gold medals and 32 in total. The United States, runners-up in the competition, also took eleven gold medals, but had a lesser haul overall with 17 medal performances. East Germany and Italy had the next greatest number of gold medals, with four and three respectively, but it was the host nation Romania which was third place in the total tally, having won two golds but fifteen medals overall.

The competition featured a men's marathon race and a 20 kilometres road walk for the first time, expanding the programme outside of the usual track and field stadium. The women's 3000 metres also made its first Games appearance, having been previously held at only the 1975 World University Championships in Athletics competition. The 400 metres hurdles and 4×400 metres relay for women were other new additions to the Universiade athletics contest, while the women's pentathlon was replaced with the more extensive heptathlon event.

Saïd Aouita demonstrated his potential with a win in the 1500 metres in a Games record time. The 1980 Olympic gold medallists Dainis Kūla (javelin) and Maurizio Damilano (20 km walk) won their respective disciplines. On the women's side, reigning Olympic champions Tatyana Kolpakova and Sara Simeoni won the long jump and high jump events. Konstantin Volkov, the 1980 Olympic silver medallist, was another high-profile name and he set a record to win the men's pole vault. Romanian Doina Melinte won the women's 800 metres gold and 1500 m silver and later went on to win medals of those colours at the 1984 Summer Olympics. An unusual mistake occurred in the men's 10,000 metres competition, as the athletes ran a further lap of the circuit than intended – resulting in a total distance of 10,400 m.

Medal summary

Men's events

 † = The 10,000 m race was held for one lap too many, resulting in a final distance of 10,400 m.

Women's events

Medal table

References

World Student Games (Universiade – Men). GBR Athletics. Retrieved on 2010-08-25.
World Student Games (Universiade – Women). GBR Athletics. Retrieved on 2010-08-25.

 
1981 Summer Universiade
1981
1981 in athletics (track and field)
1981 Summer Universiade